St. John's School or Saint John's School may refer to:

Canada
Lower Canada College of Montreal, originally known as St. John's School
St. John Catholic School (Garson, Ontario)
St. John Catholic School, Toronto
St. John's School (Quebec), St-Jean-sur-Richelieu, Quebec
St. John's School (Vancouver), British Columbia
Saint John's School of Alberta, Stony Plain
St. John's-Ravenscourt School, Winnipeg, Manitoba
St. John Community School, Holiday Park, Saskatoon, Greater Saskatoon Catholic Schools

India
Saint John's Academy, Mirzapur Road, Allahabad, Uttar Pradesh
St. John's Matriculation Higher Secondary School Alwarthirunagar
St. John's School, Ghazipur, Uttar Pradesh
St. John's School, Marhauli, Varanasi, Uttar Pradesh
St. John's School, Varanasi, Uttar Pradesh
St. John's School, Akbarpur, Ambedkar Nagar, Uttar Pradesh
St. John's Sr. Sec. School, Meerut, Uttar Pradesh
St. John's School, Siddiqpur, Jaunpur, Uttar Pradesh

United Kingdom
St John Lloyd Catholic Comprehensive School, Llanelli, Wales
St. John the Baptist School (Aberdare), Aberdare, Wales
St John's Catholic Comprehensive School, Gravesend, Kent
St John's Catholic School, County Durham, England
St. John's Church of England Primary School, Croydon, England
St John's Priory School, Banbury, Oxfordshire, England
St John's Roman Catholic School, Essex, England
St John's School and College, Bedfordshire, England
St John's School and Community College, Marlborough, England
St John's School, Billericay, Essex
St John's School, Enfield
St John's School, Leatherhead, Surrey, England

United States
St. John's Military School, Salina, Kansas
Saint John's Catholic Prep (Maryland)
 St. John's School for Boys, former name of The Manlius School, Manlius, New York
Saint John School (Ashtabula, Ohio)
St. John's High School (Delphos, Ohio)
St. John's Jesuit High School and Academy, Toledo, Ohio
St. John's School (Texas), Houston, Texas
St. John's Northwestern Military Academy, Delafield, Wisconsin

Insular areas
St. John's School (Guam), Tumon, Guam
Saint John's School (San Juan), a private school in Puerto Rico

Other places
 St. John's School, a school in Martinez, Pilar, Argentina
St. John's International School (Belgium), Waterloo, Belgium
Saint John's School, San Pedro de la Paz, Concepción, Chile
St. John's School, Cyprus
St. John's School, Sekondi, Ghana
St. John's Institution, Kuala Lumpur, Malaysia
St John's School, Mairangi Bay, New Zealand
St. John's Diocesan School for Girls, Pietermaritzburg, KwaZulu-Natal, South Africa
Saint John's International School (Thailand), Bangkok, Thailand

See also
Saint John's College (disambiguation)
St. John's High School (disambiguation)
St. John's Preparatory School (disambiguation)
St. John's Primary School (disambiguation)